Darren Carter (born 8 January 1972) is a former professional rugby league footballer who played in the 1990s and 2000s.

Career records
Darren Carter holds two records for Barrow. During the Regal Trophy match against Nottingham City on Sunday 27 November 1994 he kicked 17 goals and scored two tries in the 138–0 win. The 17 goals was the club most goals in a game record and with 42 points in total, a club record for most points in a match.

References

1972 births
Living people
Barrow Raiders players
English rugby league players
Place of birth missing (living people)
Rugby league centres
Rugby league five-eighths
Workington Town players